Milano Lancetti is an underground railway station in Milan, Italy. It opened in 1997 as part of the Milan Passante railway, as its north-western gate. It is located on Viale Vincenzo Lancetti. The train services are operated by Trenord.

Train services
The station is served by the following services:

Milan Metropolitan services (S1) Saronno - Milan - Lodi
Milan Metropolitan services (S2) Mariano Comense - Seveso - Milan
Milan Metropolitan services (S5) Varese - Rho - Milan - Treviglio
Milan Metropolitan services (S6) Novara - Rho - Milan - Treviglio
Milan Metropolitan services (S12) Milan - Melegnano
Milan Metropolitan services (S13) Milan - Pavia

See also 
Railway stations in Milan
Milan suburban railway network
Milan Passante railway

References 

Lancetti
Railway stations opened in 1997
Milan S Lines stations
Railway stations located underground in Italy
1997 establishments in Italy
Railway stations in Italy opened in the 20th century